Frank Lucius Packard (February 2, 1877 – February 17, 1942) was a Canadian novelist.

Life
Frank L. Packard was born in Montreal, Quebec and educated at McGill University and the University of Liège. As a young man he worked as a civil engineer for the Canadian Pacific Railway. His experiences working on the railroad led to his writing many railroad stories, then to a series of mystery novels, the most famous of which featured a character called Jimmie Dale.

Several of his novels were made into films.

Frank Packard died in 1942 in Lachine, Quebec and was buried in the Mount Royal Cemetery in Montreal.

Works

Jimmie Dale series
The Adventures of Jimmie Dale  (1917) – (Wikisource text)
The Further Adventures of Jimmie Dale  (1919) – (Wikisource text)
Jimmie Dale and the Phantom Clue  (1922)
Jimmie Dale and Blue Envelope Murder  (1930)
Jimmie Dale and the Missing Hour  (1935)
Return of the Grey Seal  (2007) – (e-book compilation of first two books)
Jimmie Dale, Alias the Gray Seal by Michael Howard  (2017) – (The first new Gray Seal book in more than eighty years.)

Other works
 On the Iron at Big Cloud (1911) (Wikisource text)
Greater Love Hath No Man (1913) (Wikisource text)
The Miracle Man  (1914) – (Wikisource text)
The Belovéd Traitor  (1915) – (Project Gutenberg book)
The Sin That Was His  (1917)
The Wire Devils  (1918)
Coogan's Last Run. (Novella) Published in Top-Notch magazine, Feb. 1918; a slightly expanded version of the short story "The Guardian of the Devil's Slide," which is included in On The Iron at Big Cloud (1911).)
From Now On  (1919)
The Night Operator  (1919)
The White Moll  (1920) – (Wikisource text)
Pawned  (1921)
Doors of the Night  (1922)
The Four Stragglers  (1923)
The Locked Book  (1924)
Running Special  (1925)
Broken Waters  (1925)
The Red Ledger  (1926)
The Devil's Mantle  (1927)
Two Stolen Idols  (1927)
Shanghai Jim  (1928)
The Big Shot  (1929)
Tiger Claws  (1929)
Gold Skull Murders  (1931)
The Hidden Door  (1933)
The Purple Ball  (1933)
The Dragon's Jaws  (1937)
More Knaves Than One (1938) (Includes: More Knaves Than One, The King of Fools, Behind The Masks, and The Devil Sits In.)

References

External links

 
 
 
 
 
 Sony Reader e-book version of Return of The Grey Seal
 Frank L. Packard fonds (R1916) at Library and Archives Canada

1877 births
1942 deaths
20th-century Canadian male writers
20th-century Canadian novelists
Anglophone Quebec people
Burials at Mount Royal Cemetery
Canadian civil engineers
Canadian mystery writers
Canadian male novelists
McGill University alumni
University of Liège alumni
Writers from Montreal